Hanley bus station is a bus station in Hanley, Stoke-on-Trent.

History 
Hanley bus station was constructed in the 1970s. The current bus station was built at a cost of £15 million on the site of the John Street car park, across the road from the original bus station. Following two years of construction, it opened on 26 March 2013.

Future 
The bus station is set to be refurbished in a £1.4 million project, which will see a new vehicular entrance created.

Design 
The building was designed by Grimshaw Architects and has a curved aluminium-clad roof. The bus station has 22 stances.

References 

Bus stations in England